Dastuiyeh (also Romanized as Dastū’īyeh) is a village in Raviz Rural District, Koshkuiyeh District, Rafsanjan County, Kerman Province, Iran. At the 2006 census, its population was 36, in 9 families.

References 

Populated places in Rafsanjan County